João Vitor Moreira dos Santos (born 28 May 2000), known as João Vitor or Robinho, is a Brazilian footballer who plays as a forward for Coritiba.

Club career
Born in Montes Claros, Minas Gerais, João Vitor played for the youth sides of América Mineiro before being released. In 2018, he made his senior debut while playing for hometown side  in the Campeonato Mineiro Segunda Divisão.

In 2019, after a brief period in the under-20 side of América de Teófilo Otoni, João Vitor joined Coritiba's youth setup. On 3 August 2020, he renewed his contract with the latter club until December 2022.

João Vitor made his first team debut for Coxa on 25 July 2021, coming on as a second-half substitute for Rafinha in a 1–0 Série B away loss against Operário Ferroviário. On 20 October, in only his second match as a professional, he scored his side's third in a 3–0 home win over Sampaio Corrêa.

On 14 January 2022, João Vitor was loaned to Linense for the year's Campeonato Paulista Série A2. Upon returning, he made his Série A debut with Coritiba on 20 July, replacing Alef Manga late into a 3–1 away defeat to Corinthians.

Career statistics

References

External links
Coritiba profile 

2000 births
Living people
Sportspeople from Minas Gerais
Brazilian footballers
Association football forwards
Campeonato Brasileiro Série A players
Campeonato Brasileiro Série B players
Coritiba Foot Ball Club players
Clube Atlético Linense players